Lin Yu-lang (born 25 December 1985) is a Taiwanese badminton player. In 2008, he won the BWF Grand Prix title at the New Zealand Open in the men's doubles event with Chen Hung-ling. In 2009, he and Chen also won the Chinese Taipei Open, Polish International, and Finnish International. Lin was the men's doubles silver medallists at the 2009 East Asian Games and 2010 Asian Championships.

Achievements

Asian Championships 
Men's doubles

East Asian Games
Men's doubles

BWF Grand Prix 
The BWF Grand Prix has two levels: Grand Prix and Grand Prix Gold. It is a series of badminton tournaments, sanctioned by the Badminton World Federation (BWF) since 2007.

Men's doubles

 BWF Grand Prix Gold tournament
 BWF Grand Prix tournament

BWF International Challenge/Series
Men's doubles

 BWF International Challenge tournament
 BWF International Series tournament

References

External links
 

Living people
1985 births
Taiwanese male badminton players
Badminton players at the 2010 Asian Games
Asian Games competitors for Chinese Taipei